Moclín is a municipality in the province of Granada, Spain. As of 2010, it has a population of 4237 inhabitants.

The Battle of Moclín took place here in 1280.

References

Municipalities in the Province of Granada